The German city of Friedrichshafen was bombed during World War II as part of the Allied strategic bombing campaign against German war materiel industry, particularly in the targeting of German fighter aircraft production and long range missile development.

Background
Friedrichshafen lies in the Bodenseekreis district, on Lake Constance in the extreme south of Germany, and at the time it was at the edge of the German nightfighter defences.
Targets included the Dornier Flugzeugwerke aircraft works at Manzell, the Maybach tank engine factory, the Luftschiffbau Zeppelin aircraft works and its Oberraderach test facility near Raderach, and the Zahnradfabrik Friedrichshafen (literally "gearwheel factory Friedrichshafen") tank gearbox factory.

In February 1944 an underground factory at Immenstaad near Friedrichshafen was suspected to be a synthetic oil and/or liquid oxygen plant.
Near Überlingen, forced labor of KZ-Häftlinge im Goldbacher Stollen, KZ Nebenlager Raderach and the Aufkirch subcamp of Dachau concentration camp was used for constructing an underground facility for armament manufacturing (code name "Magnesit") safe from Allied air raids.

Attacks

References
Notes

Bibliography

External links
 Operation Bellicose map
 ZF Friedrichshafen damage

Oil campaign of World War II
F
Friedrichshafen
Friedrichshafen